Maurice Taylor could refer to: 

Maurice Taylor (born 1976), American basketball player
Maurice Taylor (British Army officer) (1881–1960), British Army officer
Maurice Taylor (bishop) (born 1926), Scottish Roman Catholic bishop
Morry Taylor (Maurice Taylor Jr., born 1944), American businessman and former presidential candidate